Ysis Amariele Sonkeng (born September 20, 1989, Baleveng) is a Cameroonian women's football player, who plays for the Cameroon women's national football team and Louves Minproff de Yaoundé. She plays as a defender and played in the 2012 Summer Olympics. She was known for scoring an own goal against New Zealand.

References

External links
 

1989 births
Living people
Women's association football defenders
Cameroonian women's footballers
Cameroon women's international footballers
2015 FIFA Women's World Cup players
2019 FIFA Women's World Cup players
Olympic footballers of Cameroon
Footballers at the 2012 Summer Olympics
African Games silver medalists for Cameroon
African Games medalists in football
Competitors at the 2015 African Games
Cameroonian expatriate women's footballers
Cameroonian expatriate sportspeople in Israel
Expatriate women's footballers in Israel
20th-century Cameroonian women
21st-century Cameroonian women